Timothy Joel "TJ" Eyoma (born 29 January 2000) is an English professional football defender who plays for EFL League One side Lincoln City.

Early and personal life
Eyoma was born and raised in Hackney and attended Highbury Grove School. His brother Aaron Eyoma or "AJ" is also a footballer, who was previously at Arsenal and Derby County. Eyoma played youth football at Clissold Rangers and  Islington-based club Crown & Manor.

Career

Early career
Described as comfortable at centre back and right back, in September 2018 Eyoma signed a professional contract with Spurs until 2021. On 4 January 2019 he was named as a substitute against Tranmere Rovers for the FA Cup match at Prenton Park and came on to make his first team debut.

Lincoln City
On 30 January 2020, Eyoma joined Lincoln City on loan until the end of the 2019–20 season. But due to the COVID-19 pandemic cutting short the season, he did not feature for the club and returned to Tottenham Hotspur without making an appearance. On 11 August 2020, Eyoma rejoined Lincoln City on a season-long loan until the end of the 2020–21 campaign. shortly after signing a new three-year contract with Tottenham. He made his Lincoln City debut against Crewe Alexandra in the EFL Cup on the opening day of the season.  On 17 August 2021 it was announced by Lincoln City that Eyoma would rejoin the Imps for a third time, as a permanent signing for an undisclosed fee. He made his first appearance as a full-time Lincoln City player in the EFL Trophy against Manchester United U21.

International career
Born in England, Eyoma is of Nigerian descent. Eyoma was part of the England side that won the U17 World Cup in India.

Career statistics

Honours 
England U17
FIFA U-17 World Cup: 2017
UEFA European Under-17 Championship runner-up: 2017

Notes

References

External links 
 Profile at Tottenham Hotspur

2000 births
Living people
Footballers from the London Borough of Hackney
English footballers
England youth international footballers
Association football defenders
Crown & Manor F.C. players
Tottenham Hotspur F.C. players
Lincoln City F.C. players
English Football League players
Black British sportspeople
English people of Nigerian descent